The Hungarian Actuarial Society was founded in 1991 to represent actuaries in Hungary. , it has about 140 members, 80 of which are qualified (full) members. It is a full member of the International Actuarial Association and the Groupe Consultatif.

External links
Official Site of the Hungarian Actuarial Society

Actuarial associations
Professional associations based in Hungary